Nick Kochan is a financial and political journalist based in London. He has written extensively on financial and white collar crime. He writes for UK newspapers and international magazines, and has written and co-written books. Kochan is also a lecturer and conference speaker on financial crime and politics.

Early life and education
Kochan was educated at Magdalen College School in Oxford, and at Fitzwilliam College, Cambridge, graduating in Classics and English in 1976.

Published works
 2011, October: Corruption: The New Corporate Challenge, (with Robin Goodyear) Published by Palgrave-Macmillan
 2008, November: What Happened, and other questions everyone is asking about the Credit Crunch (with Hugh Pym), Published by Old Street Publishing
 2006, December: The Middle East markets: The new opportunities, Published by Thomson Financial
 2006, August: The Washing Machine, paperback edition, with additional chapter on David Mills and Berlusconi, Published by Duckworth
 2005: The Washing Machine: how money laundering and terrorist financing soils us, Published by Thomson-Texere Publishing
 2000: Ann Widdecombe: Right from the beginning, Published by Politico’s Publishing
 1998: Gordon Brown: the first year in power (with Hugh Pym), Published by Bloomsbury
 1996: The World’s Greatest Brands, edited by Nicholas Kochan, Published by Macmillan
 1994: Biography of Sir David Alliance, privately commissioned by the subject
 1992: Hanson. A biography. Serialised by the Sunday Business newspaper. Commissioned Hamish Hamilton, [Never published due to legal reasons]
 1991: Bankrupt, The BCCI fraud, Published by Victor Gollancz  (with Bob Whittington)
 1991: New Directions in Corporate Governance, Published by the Economist Intelligence Unit
 1987: The Guinness Affair, anatomy of the scandal, published by Christopher Helm  (with Hugh Pym)

Freelance newspaper and magazine journalism 
Kochan has published numerous articles in: 
 The Observer
 The Economist
 The Times
 The Sunday Times
 The Sunday Telegraph
 The Guardian
 New Statesman
 Euromoney Magazine
 The Director
 Offshore Financial Review

Kochan is also a Contributing Editor to Euromoney Magazine and contributing editor to The Banker.

Radio and television journalism 

Kochan regularly appears on BBC Radio and TV and Sky as an expert on money laundering, economics, finance, politics and terrorist finance.

Kochan interviewed 12 British businessmen for two series of six programmes about entrepreneurs for BBC Radio Four. He also conducted six radio interviews with Jewish writers for another BBC Radio Four series.

In 1990, Kochan researched a Despatches  programme for Channel Four about the Guinness affair.

References

External links 
 Nick Kochan's website

British male journalists
Living people
Alumni of Fitzwilliam College, Cambridge
People educated at Magdalen College School, Oxford
Year of birth missing (living people)